Portugal national rugby team may refer to:

 Portugal national rugby union team
 Portugal women's national rugby union team
 Portugal national rugby sevens team
 Portugal women's national rugby union team (sevens)
 Portugal national rugby league team